KKVT (100.7 FM) is a radio station broadcasting an adult hits format. Licensed to Grand Junction, Colorado, United States, it serves the Grand Junction area. The station is currently owned by Mbc Grand Broadcasting.

History
On August 1, 2013, KMOZ-FM changed their call letters to KKVT and changed their format to adult hits, branded as "The Vault", swapping frequencies with KKVT 92.3 FM Grand Junction.

KKVT-HD2
On May 25, 2017, KKVT launched an oldies format on its HD2 subchannel, branded as "95.5 The Monkey" (simulcast on FM translator K238BK 95.7 FM Grand Junction). Due to interference reports from listeners to 95.5 KRKQ Mountain Village CO being filed with the FCC, the KKVT HD2 oldies format was rebranded as "95.7 The Monkey" and the translator frequency changed to 95.7 as of November 2, 2017.

KKVT-HD3
On May 25, 2017, KKVT launched an adult album alternative format on its HD3 subchannel, branded as "103.9 The Planet" (simulcast on FM translator K279CB 103.9 FM Grand Junction).

Translators
KKVT is also broadcast on the following translators:

References

External links

KVT
Radio stations established in 1983